Chrysolytis deliarcha is a moth in the  family Lyonetiidae. It is found in South Africa.

References

Endemic moths of South Africa
Lyonetiidae
Moths of Africa